Gunness railway station, later suffixed "and Burringham", is a former railway station in Gunness, Lincolnshire. Today trains call at the nearby Althorpe.

The station was opened by the Trent, Ancholme and Grimsby Railway and was situated on a short branch from the main line.

References

Disused railway stations in the Borough of North Lincolnshire
Railway stations in Great Britain closed in 1916